Ray Lissner (January 10, 1903 – April 28, 1944) was an American filmmaker who worked during the end of the silent era into the beginning of sound films.  He spent his entire career as an assistant director, working with such directors such as Herbert Brenon, Charles Vidor, George Archainbaud, and Otto Brower.

Life and career
Born in New York City in 1903, he began his career in movies with the 1926 silent classic, The Great Gatsby, assisting Herbert Brenon.  He would work with Brenon more than any other director, collaborating with him on twelve films.  Some other notable films Lissner worked on were: the original Beau Geste in 1926 (again with Brenon); Flying Down to Rio, the first film teaming Ginger Rogers and Fred Astaire; and The Gay Divorcee, again with Astaire and Rogers.

Lissner would die in 1944 at the age of 41.

Filmography
(as per AFI's database)

References

External links
 
 

1903 births
1944 deaths
Film directors from New York City